Mary Josephine Donovan O'Sullivan was Professor of History at Queens College, Galway (now NUI Galway) from 1914 to 1957.

Biography
One of ten children, four of whom survived infancy, Donovan was born at Fair Hill Road in Galway on 24 November 1887 and was the daughter of Royal Navy gunner William Donovan and Bridget Hurley, both natives of County Cork. She was educated at the Dominican College, Galway City. In 1915, in Edinburgh she married Jeremiah O'Sullivan from County Tipperary who was serving in the Royal Engineers at the time.

Mary Josephine was editor of the Journal of the Galway Archaeological and Historical Society from November 1932 to January 1951.

Her main contribution to the history of Galway in the late medieval - early modern age was Old Galway, which examined the growth of the town, its culture and politics, its trade and its ruling families, The Tribes of Galway. Most of the first edition of the book was destroyed during The Blitz in London, and was only reprinted in 1959 in Galway.

From early in the 1900s, she was an active member of the local women's Suffrage movement.

She was a sister of John Thomas Donovan, late of the Indian Civil Service.

Select bibliography
All the following were published in the Journal of the Galway Archaeological and Historical Society

 The Lay School at Galway in the sixteenth and seventeenth centuries, p. 1-32, Vol. 15, Nos. i & ii
 Glimpses of the life of Galway merchants and mariners in the early seventeenth century, pp. 129–140, volume 15, Nos. iii & iv
 The fortification of Galway in the sixteenth and early seventeenth centuries, pp. 1–47, volume 16 (1934–1935), Nos. i & ii, 1-47
 Barnabe Googe, Provost-Marshal of Connaught, 1582–1585, pp. 1–39, volume 18 (1938–1939), Nos. i & ii
 Note on the St. Nicholas MSS., pp. 69–71, volume 18 (1938–1939), Nos. i & ii
 The use of leisure in old Galway, pp. 99–120 volume 18(1938–1939), Nos. iii & iv
 Some documents relating to Galway, pp. 170–182, volume 18 (1938–1939), Nos. iii & iv
 The wives of Ulick, 1st Earl of Clanricarde, pp. 174–183, volume 21 (1944–1945), Nos. iii & iv
 Italian merchant bankers and the collection of papal revenues in Ireland in the thirteenth century, pp. 132–163, volume 22, (1946–1947), Nos. iii & iv
 The Centenary of Galway College, lecture delivered on 19 November 1949, published in volume 51, 1999.

See also
 Emily Anderson
 Florence Moon
 James Lydon

Further reading
 On the "Western Outpost":Local Government and Women's Suffrage in County Galway, 1898-1918, Mary Clancy, pp. 557–587, in "Galway:History and Society", 1996
 Obituary: Mary J. Donovan O'Sullivan, G. A. H.-McC. Analecta Hibernica, No. 26 (1970), pp. xii-xiv (article consists of 3 pages) Published by: The Irish Manuscripts Commission Ltd. Stable URL: 
 

1880s births
1966 deaths
Academics of the University of Galway
20th-century Irish historians
Irish women academics
People from County Galway
20th-century Irish women writers
20th-century Irish writers
Irish suffragists
Women historians